in D major, K. 32, is a quodlibet composed in March 1766 by Wolfgang Amadeus Mozart during his grand tour of Europe. It was first performed at The Hague on 11 March 1766. 
A typical performance of this piece lasts twenty minutes.

Instrumentation and structure 
The work is scored for strings, two horns, two oboes, bassoon and harpsichord and consists of seventeen movements:

 Molto allegro
 Andante in D minor
 Allegro
 Pastorella in G major
 Allegro
 Allegretto in A major
 Allegro
 Molto adagio in G major
 Allegro in C major
 Largo in D minor
 Allegro
 Andante in F major
 Allegro in E-flat major
 Menuet in F major
 Adagio in D minor
 Presto
 Fugue in F major

Sources of the music 
The piece has some movements which were composed on the basis of other existing pieces not by Mozart.

Manuscripts 
Galimathias musicum survives in four manuscripts which represent two different versions of the work.

References

External links

1766 compositions
Compositions by Wolfgang Amadeus Mozart